Radfeld is a municipality in the Kufstein district in the Austrian state of Tyrol located 1 km east of the town of Rattenberg, 13 km west of Wörgl, and 24 km southwest of Kufstein.

References

Cities and towns in Kufstein District